Allen Bernard Berg (born August 1, 1961) is a Canadian former racing driver who raced for the Osella team in Formula One.

Racing career
Berg was born in Vancouver, British Columbia. He began in karting in 1978 and switched to cars when he was 20, into Formula Atlantic. In 1982 he won the prestigious Tasman Formula Pacific Series in Australia and New Zealand and entered the British Formula 3 series in 1983. However, his timing was bad since he had to compete against Ayrton Senna and Martin Brundle. He won one race (one which Senna and Brundle opted out of to compete for European F3 points and outright race win) and ended up fifth in the series. The following year he was runner-up in the British F3 series to Johnny Dumfries with eight second places. In 1985 he returned to Canada to seek funding for Formula One.

In 1986 he managed to buy a seat in the Osella F1 team midway through the season, taking the seat vacated by Christian Danner, who had left to join the Arrows team to replace Marc Surer – Surer having suffered career-ending injuries in the 1986 ADAC Hessen-Rallye between the Belgian and Canadian Grands Prix. Berg took part in nine races before his sponsorship ran out and he missed the Italian Grand Prix; further sponsorship did at least mean he was able to see out the season. He had opportunities to continue in F1 in 1987; however, with the cancellation of the Canadian Grand Prix that season, he could not raise enough sponsorship and was unable to secure a drive.

Berg has remained involved in motor sport as a professional driver, team owner, series administrator, driving coach and instructor. He has competed in sportscar racing and the Trans-Am Series. He spent a season driving a privateer BMW M3 in the Deutsche Tourenwagen Meisterschaft in 1991, before enjoying success on the Mexican racing scene, winning the Mexican Formula 2 championship in 1993. He also won the Indy Lights Panamericana title in 2001 as a driver-owner, before retiring from driving.

He currently operates Allen Berg Racing Schools primarily in Monterey, California, based at WeatherTech Raceway Laguna Seca. Allen Berg Racing Schools provides a race driving experience in formula racing cars for people with little to no experience. The school also provides instructional programs for up-and-coming drivers to work their way into driving professionally. Multiple graduates of the school have gone on to drive race cars for a career.

Racing record

Complete Formula One results
(key)

Complete 24 Hours of Le Mans results

24 Hours of Le Mans results

References

External links
Profile on F1 Rejects
F1 Rejects interview with Allen Berg
Richard's F1 interview with Allen Berg
Allen Berg Racing Schools

1961 births
24 Hours of Le Mans drivers
Canadian Formula One drivers
Canadian people of Swedish descent
Living people
Osella Formula One drivers
Racing drivers from British Columbia
Sportspeople from Vancouver
World Sportscar Championship drivers